Khudumelapye or Kudumelapye is a village in Kweneng District of Botswana. It is located 30 km north-west of Letlhakeng. The population of Khudumelapye was 1,837 in 2001 census.

References

Kweneng District
Villages in Botswana